Ljubisav Luković (born 28 August 1962) is a Serbian professional basketball coach and former player.

Playing career 
Luković played for IMT / Beopetrol and Borovica. During the 1991–92 season, he played in the UAE League.

Post-playing career 
He was an assistant coach of KK Partizan, also he used to work as an international scout for the Phoenix Suns and has worked as an expert commentator in the Radio Belgrade.

Personal life 
He is father of Uroš (born 1989), Marko (born 1992), and Branka (born 1995), all professional basketball players. Uroš played for FMP, Kumanovo, Partizan, Mornar, and Zadar among others. Marko played for Mega Vizura, Krka,  UCAM Murcia, Manresa, Split, Breogán among others. Uroš and Marko were teammates during the 2015–16 season playing for MZT Skopje. Branka played for Voždovac, Partizan, and Valencia Basket among others.

References

External links

Player Profile at eurobasket.com
Coach Profile at eurobasket.com

1962 births
Living people
KK Borovica players
KK Beopetrol/Atlas Beograd players
KK Beopetrol/Atlas Beograd coaches
KK IMT Beograd players
People from Sjenica
National Basketball Association scouts from Europe
Serbian men's basketball players
Serbian men's basketball coaches
Power forwards (basketball)
Phoenix Suns scouts
Serbian expatriate basketball people in North Macedonia
Serbian expatriate basketball people in the United Arab Emirates
Serbian basketball scouts